The British Society of Periodontology is a society of periodontologists (i.e. Dental Care Professionalss who specialize in treating gum diseases) in the United Kingdom. It was founded in 1949 and its aim is to "promote the art and science of periodontology". Its activities include advisory publications for professionals and the public, educational workshops, society meetings and awards for research.

See also
American Board of Periodontology
American Academy of Periodontology Foundation
European Federation of Periodontology

External links
 BSP Website
 BSP Lectures on periodontology for dental students and dentists

Periodontology